"Cool World" is a song by Australian rock band Mondo Rock, released in March 1981 as the second single released from the band's second studio album Chemistry (1981). The song became the band's second top ten single, peaking at number 8 on the Kent Music Report. The song was written by Mondo Rock's lead vocalist Ross Wilson.

At the 1981 Countdown Music Awards, the song was nominated for Best Australian Single.

Track listing 
AUS 7" Single 

UK 7" Single

Charts

Weekly charts

Year-end charts

References 

1981 songs
1981 singles
Mondo Rock songs
Songs written by Ross Wilson (musician)
Warner Music Group singles
Atlantic Records singles